Crassispira bruehli is a species of sea snail, a marine gastropod mollusk in the family Pseudomelatomidae.

Description
The length of the shell attains 11mm.

Distribution
This marine species occurs off Palawan Island, Coron, Philippines.

References

 Stahlschmidt P. & Fraussen K. (2014) Two new turrid species (Gastropoda: Pseudomelatomidae) from the Palawan region, the Philippines. Zootaxa 3784(1): 89-93. [26 March 2014]

External links
 

bruehli
Gastropods described in 2014